Lecanora muscigena is a species of lichen in the family Lecanoraceae. It was described as new to science in 2020 by Dag Øvstedal & Alan Fryday. It is found in the subantarctic island of South Georgia, where it grows on ground-dwelling mosses.

See also
List of Lecanora species

References

Lichen species
Lichens described in 2020
muscigena